The Mystery of Alexina, also titled Alexina, is a 1985 French historical drama directed by René Féret and centered upon the intersex memoirist Herculine Barbin. It was screened in the Un Certain Regard section at the 1985 Cannes Film Festival.

Cast
 Philippe Vuillemin as Alexina Barbin / Camille Barbin
 Valérie Stroh as Sara
 Véronique Silver as Madame Avril
 Bernard Freyd as Armand
 Marianne Basler as Marie Avril
 Pierre Vial as Priest
 Philippe Clévenot as Doctor Chesnet
 Isabelle Gruault as Josephine
 Lucienne Hamon as Hotel manager
 Claude Bouchery sa School inspector
 Olivier Sabran as Doctor
 Michel Amphoux as Hotel manager
 Anne Cornaly as Alexina's mother
 Vincent Pinel as Doctor

References

External links

1985 films
1980s French-language films
1985 drama films
French drama films
Films directed by René Féret
Films about intersex
Films set in the 19th century
1980s French films